The Smart Crosstown is a concept car developed by the Smart division of Daimler AG and first shown to the public at the 2005 Frankfurt Motor Show.   

It is a three-cylinder petrol/electric hybrid based on the Smart Fortwo. It also features a targa-style roof.

References 

 

Concept cars
Crosstown